Grande Fratello 1 is the first season of the Italian version of the reality show franchise Big Brother. It follows ten contestants, known as housemates, who are isolated from the outside world for an extended period of time in a custom-built house. Every two weeks, one housemate is evicted by a public vote. The last remaining housemate, Cristina Plevani, was declared the winner.

The first season debuted on 14 September 2000 and concluded on 21 December 2000.

Format
Every two weeks, the housemates were called to the confessional to nominate someone, choosing two housemates whom they wished the public to vote on. The two or more housemates with the most nominations would face the public vote, and the least popular housemate was evicted from the house.

Housemates

Nominations table

Viewership
Grande Fratello started with five million viewers at the launch of the show. Viewing figures increased fast, with ten million viewers watching the eighth episode. It reached sixteen million viewers at the season finale.

2000 Italian television seasons
01